Phylladiorhynchus bengalensis is a species of squat lobster in the family Galatheidae. It is found in the Andaman Sea.

References

Squat lobsters
Crustaceans described in 1980